Gunnel Jennie Ann Carlson, née Persson (born 25 November 1956, Asarum, Blekinge County, Sweden) is a Swedish garden-topic journalist, author and television presenter. She is known for presenting the SVT gardening show Gröna rum. She is also an author of several books, and is a regular at the SVT show Go'kväll.

Bibliography
Carlson, Gunnel (2000). Gröna rum. Stockholm: Prisma. Libris 7408813. 
Carlson, Gunnel; Hultin Susanna, Ljung Victoria, Magnusson Gunnar, Gustavsson Lars-Åke, Wedblad Johan (2003). Gröna hjälpen: 106 frågor och svar om växter ute och inne. Stockholm: Prisma. Libris 8872387. 
Växter för balkong & uterum: [blommande växter, grönsaker, sydfrukter, kryddor, inredningstips]. Sundbyberg: Semic. 2004. Libris 9426147. 
Växthus & uterum: [praktiska råd, blommor, grönsaker, sydfrukter, kryddor, inredningsförslag]. Sundbyberg: Semic. 2006. Libris 10025719. 
Carlson Gunnel, red (2007). Trädgårdsguiden: om konsten att hitta smultronställen i trädgårdssverige : en underbar resa bland Sveriges öppna trädgårdar från söder till norr. Malmö: Arena. Libris 10367664. 
Hultin, Susanna; Carlson Gunnel, Persson Görgen (2008). Skydda trädgården från rådjur, sniglar, bladlöss och andra skadedjur. Sundbyberg: Semic. Libris 10642893. 
Hultin, Susanna; Carlson Gunnel, Persson Görgen (2009). Rensa trädgården: från kirskål, kvickrot, maskrosor, tistlar och annat ogräs. Sundbyberg: Semic. Libris 11204821. 
Carlson, Gunnel; Magnusson Gunnar (2009). Vackert i vasen. Kosta: Kosta förlag. Libris 11446868. 
Arvidsson, Gösta; Carlson Gunnel, Yeh Tomas (2010). Lust till livet. Göteborg: Tre stiftelser. Libris 11856587. 
Hultin, Susanna; Carlson Gunnel, Persson Görgen (2010). Första trädgårdshjälpen: vanliga frågor & oumbärliga svar. Sundbyberg: Semic. Libris 11654061. 
Hultin, Susanna; Carlson Gunnel, Persson Görgen (2011). Största trädgårdshjälpen: om ogräs och skadedjur. Sundbyberg: Semic. Libris 11974329. 
Carlson Gunnel, red (2011). Trädgårdsriket: guide till 850 svenska trädgårdar. Stockholm: Norstedt. Libris 12087272. 
Kewenter, Ewa; Carlson Gunnel, Turander Ralf, Yeh Tomas (2012). Gunnebo: historien, hantverket, trädgårdarna, maten. Malmö: Arena. Libris 12442554. 
Carlson, Gunnel; Bergdahl Pernilla (2012). Min gröna passion. Stockholm: Norstedts. Libris 12346040.

References

External links 

Living people
1956 births
20th-century Swedish women writers
21st-century Swedish women writers
Swedish television personalities
Swedish women television presenters